NMS Mărășești was one of four s ordered by Romania shortly before the beginning of the First World War from Italy. All four sister ships were requisitioned when Italy joined the war in 1915. Originally named Vârtej by the Romanians, she was renamed Nibbio in Italian service. Not completed until mid-1918, the ship engaged Austro-Hungarian ships in the Adriatic Sea only once before the war ended in November. She was renamed Mărășești when she was re-purchased by the Romanians in 1920.

After the Axis invasion of the Soviet Union on 22 June 1941 (Operation Barbarossa), Mărășești was limited to escort duties in the western half of the Black Sea during the war by the powerful Soviet Black Sea Fleet which heavily outnumbered Axis naval forces there. The ship claimed to have sunk a Soviet submarines during the war, but this has not been confirmed by post-war research. In early 1944 the Soviets were able to cut off and surround the port of Sevastopol on the Crimean Peninsula; Mărășești escorted convoys evacuating Axis troops from the port and rescued some troops herself in May.

Later that year Romania switched sides, but despite that the Soviets seized the Romanian ships and incorporated them into the Soviet Navy. Renamed Lyogkiy, the ship only served for a year before she was returned to the Romanians who redesignated her as D11 in 1952. She was discarded in 1961 and subsequently scrapped.

Design and description

The Vifor-class destroyers were ordered in 1913 by Romania from the Pattison Shipyard in Italy, as part of the 1912 Naval Program. They were to be armed with three  guns, four  guns, five  torpedo tubes and have a 10-hour endurance at full speed. Three ships had been laid down by the time Italy joined the Allied side in World War I on 23 May 1915 by declaring war on the Austro-Hungarian Empire. The Italians requisitioned the Romanian ships on 5 June, redesignating them as Aquila-class scout cruisers (esploratori). By this time Vârtej approximately 20 percent complete and was renamed Nibbio.

Their crew numbered 9 officers and 137 sailors. The ships were powered by two Tosi steam turbines, each driving a single propeller, using steam provided by five Thornycroft boilers.

The Italians initially intended to arm the ships with seven 120 mm guns and two pairs of twin mounts for 45 cm torpedo tubes, but they changed the gun armament to three  and four 76 mm weapons to outgun their nearest Austro-Hungarian equivalents, the Admiral Spaun and  scout cruisers. Two of the 152 mm guns were mounted side-by-side on the forecastle and the third gun was mounted on the aft superstructure. The 76 mm anti-aircraft (AA) guns were positioned two on each broadside. The torpedo mounts were abreast the middle funnel, one on each broadside. Unlike her sisters, Nibbio could only carry 24 mines.

Construction and service

Nibbio was laid down on 15 July 1914 by Pattison in its Naples shipyard. She was launched on 30 January 1918 and commissioned on 15 May 1918. Assigned to the Adriatic, the ship was protecting the recovery of a broken-down flying boat in the Gulf of Drin with her sisters  and Sparviero on 5 September when they spotted three Austro-Hungarian torpedo boats sweeping mines. The sisters opened fire and damaged 86 F before the torpedo boats reached the shelter of Medua's coastal artillery. The following month, the trio escorted Allied ships as they bombarded Durazzo, Albania, on 2 October. Nibbio, Aquila and Sparviero covered the ships bombarding Medua on 21 October.

Nibbio and Sparviero were re-purchased by Romania in 1920. Nibbio became Mărășești and Sparviero was renamed Mărăști when they were commissioned after arriving in Romania on 1 July 1920. The ships were formally re-classified as destroyers and assigned to the newly formed Counter-torpedo Division which was renamed as the Destroyer Squadron on 1 April 1927. The sisters were sent to Italy in 1925–1926 for a refit where they had their 152 mm guns replaced by two twin-gun 120 mm Schneider-Canet-Armstrong 1918/19 turrets, one each fore and aft of the superstructure, and a fifth gun on a platform amidships. The aft 76 mm guns removed during this time. Fire-control systems were fitted the following year. The Squadron was visited by King Carol II of Romania and the Prime Minister, Nicolae Iorga, on 27 May 1931. By 1940, the midships 120 mm gun had been replaced by a pair of twin-gun French Hotchkiss  anti-aircraft machinegun mounts and the remaining 76 mm guns by a pair of German  SK C/30 AA guns. Depth charge racks had been fitted on the stern and an Italian depth charge thrower was added. The ships could carry 40 depth charges or 50 mines.

World War II

Massively outnumbered by the Soviet Union's Black Sea Fleet, the Romanian ships were kept behind the minefields defending Constanța for several months after the start of the war. They spent that time training for convoy escort operations. Beginning on 5 October, the Romanians began laying minefields to defend the route between the Bosphorus and Constanța; the minelayers were protected by the destroyers. After the evacuation of Odessa on 16 October, the navy began to clear the Soviet mines defending the port and to lay their own minefields protecting the route between Constanța and Odessa. On 20 April 1942, after the ice had melted, Mărășești, Mărăști and the destroyer  escorted the first convoy to Ochakov, although the Romanian destroyers were generally used to escort ships between the Bosporus and Constanța. On the nights of 22/23 and 24/25 June, Mărășești, Regina Maria and her sister  covered the laying of defensive minefields off Odessa. After Sevastopol surrendered on 4 July to the Axis, a direct route between the port and Constanța was opened in October and operated year-round.

Mărășești and Mărăști and two gunboats were escorting a convoy of three cargo ships on 7 July 1943 when they were attacked by a small wolfpack of three submarines.  fired six torpedoes at one of the gunboats and a freighter and missed with all of them. Mărășești depth charged one of the submarines and claimed to have sunk it, but no submarines were lost by the Soviets that day. On the night of 9/10 November, the sisters escorted minelayers as they laid a minefield off Sevastopol. The minefield was enlarged between 14 and 16 November as Regele Ferdinand and Mărășești covered the minelayers.

At some point during the war, the ship's anti-aircraft armament was augmented with two additional 3.7 cm SK C/30 and four  AA guns.

Successful Soviet attacks in early 1944 cut the overland connection of the Crimea with the rest of Ukraine and necessitated its supply by sea. In early April another offensive occupied most of the peninsula and encircled Sevastopol. The Romanians began evacuating the city on 14 April, with their destroyers covering the troop convoys. Adolf Hitler suspended the evacuation on 27 April, but relented on 8 May after further Soviet attacks further endangered the Axis forces in Sevastopol as they closed within artillery range of the harbour. Mărășești made one trip to evacuate Axis troops and was part of the last convoy to reach Sevastopol on the night of 11/12 May. Mărășești was slightly damaged during a Soviet airstrike on Constanța on 20 August.

After King Michael's Coup on 23 August, Romania declared war on the Axis Powers. Mărășești remained in harbour until she was seized by the Soviets on 5 September together with the rest of the Romanian Navy. Renamed Lyogkiy on 20 October, the ship was commissioned into the Soviet Navy as part of the Black Sea Fleet, along with her sister, on 14 September. They were returned to Romania on 12 October 1945 where they resumed their former names. The sisters were then assigned to the Destroyer Squadron before beginning an overhaul. When the Destroyer Division was redesignated as the 418th Destroyer Division in 1952, Mărășești was renamed D11. The ship continued to serve until April 1961, when she was discarded and subsequently scrapped.

Notes

Citations

Bibliography

External links
 Nibbio Marina Militare website

Cruisers of the Regia Marina
Ships built in Naples
1918 ships
World War II destroyers of Romania
Destroyers of the Soviet Navy
World War II destroyers of the Soviet Union
Captured ships
Mărăști-class destroyers